The Rangers Anti-Terrorism Wing is a specialised counter-terrorism unit of the paramilitary Sindh Rangers, operating in the city of Karachi, Pakistan. It was formed in 2004 following increased violence in Karachi. One of the primary tasks of the unit is to carry out operations against suspected terrorists.

History
In March 2013 the wing participated in a large operation of over 1,000 Rangers against potential terrorists in the Manghopir area of Karachi. In October of the same year, the unit took part in a coordinated series of actions with local police in the Lyari area of Karachi, against suspected gangs of criminals. The wing was also involved in a similar raid on Manghopir with around 1,000 Rangers in February 2014. This was followed by another operation in Manghopir of 300 personnel looking for members of illegal organisations. In February 2020 the wing transferred stolen items back to owners, which had been recovered in earlier operations.

See also
National Counter Terrorism Authority
Counter Terrorism Department (Pakistan)

References

Sindh Rangers
Counterterrorism in Pakistan
Law enforcement agencies of Pakistan
2004 establishments in Pakistan
Police special forces of Pakistan